James Ottis “Little Man” Stewart III (born December 27, 1971) is a former American football running back who played nine seasons in the National Football League (NFL). He played for the Jacksonville Jaguars and Detroit Lions from 1995 to 2003. He played college football at Tennessee.

Early life and college
Stewart played football at his high school of Morristown West High School in Morristown, Tennessee. He played college football at the University of Tennessee from 1991 to 1994. He had his only 1,000 yard rushing season his senior year, where he also ran for 11 touchdowns. While he left as the career leader in rushing yards, he's currently at the third most with 2,890, and still has the most rushing touchdowns with 35, in school history.

Collegiate statistics

Professional career

Jacksonville Jaguars
Stewart was the second selection by the new expansion Jacksonville Jaguars with the 19th pick of the first round in the 1995 NFL Draft. Stewart would play solidly for the Jaguars in his five season with the team. In his rookie season, Stewart led the Jaguars in rushing with 525 yards and also had two rushing touchdowns. He would lead the team again in 1996 with 723 yards and eight touchdowns. He finished the 1997 season with 555 yards and eight touchdowns, however he finished second on the team that year in rushing yards behind teammate Natrone Means. Stewart still holds the franchise record for the most points in a single game (30) and for the most rushing touchdowns in a game (5). Both these records were obtained on October 12, 1997 in a 38-21 Week 7 win over the Philadelphia Eagles. The Jaguars drafted Fred Taylor as their new franchise back in 1998 and, as a result, Stewart only rushed for 217 yards and two touchdowns. Due to injuries to Taylor in 1999, Stewart once again led the team with 931 rushing yards and had a career-high 13 touchdowns.

Stewart finished his career with the Jags rushing 765 times for 2,951 yards and 33 touchdowns. Stewart also played in six playoff games, including two AFC Championships, rushing 31 total times for 162 yards and two touchdowns.

Detroit Lions
Stewart became a free agent and signed with the Detroit Lions prior to the 2000 season. In his first year playing for the Lions, Stewart rushed for a career-high 1,184 yards and 10 touchdowns. In 2001, he rushed for 685 yards and one touchdown. During the 2002 season, he had another 1,000-plus yard season (1,021) and four touchdowns. He rushed for a career-high 172 yards in a 23-20 Week 7 victory over the Chicago Bears. He was, however, injured late in 2002 with a severe shoulder injury and did not play in 2003, ending his career.  According to Coy Wire, Stewart's injury occurred because of a bounty system established by then Buffalo Bills head coach Gregg Williams. Wire stated: "I shattered James Stewart's shoulder and he never played again. I was showered with praise for that. It's a shame that's how it was. Now I see how wrong that was."

Stewart finished his time with the Lions rushing 713 times for 2,890 yards and 15 touchdowns. In his career, he rushed for a total of 1,478 times for 5,841 yards and 48 touchdowns.

NFL career statistics

Regular season

Postseason

Jaguars franchise records
Most points scored in a game: 30
Most rushing touchdowns in a game: 5

Personal life
Stewart wore number 33 while playing for the University of Tennessee and the Jaguars. He wore number 34 while playing for the Lions.

He retired to Jacksonville and owns his own personal training studio called Studio 33.

Notes and references

1971 births
Living people
People from Morristown, Tennessee
American football running backs
Tennessee Volunteers football players
Jacksonville Jaguars players
Detroit Lions players
Morristown-Hamblen High School West alumni
People from Fairfield, Texas